Eric Kretz (born June 7, 1966) is an American musician and producer, best known as the drummer for the rock band Stone Temple Pilots. He has also played for Talk Show and Spiralarms. Kretz, who was born in San Jose, California, attended and graduated from Willow Glen High School in San Jose in 1984. He currently owns and operates Bomb Shelter Studios in Los Angeles. 

While in STP, Kretz has kept somewhat of a low profile but still contributed to the band's songwriting, most notably writing the music to the band's 1996 hit "Trippin' on a Hole in a Paper Heart." Along with lead vocalist Scott Weiland, Kretz also wrote the lyrics to the Grammy Award-winning hit "Plush" off STP's 1992 debut Core.

Kretz has worked with several notable artists, particularly engineering and mixing the live recordings for The Henry Rollins Show of songs by artists such as Thom Yorke, Ben Harper, Damian Marley, Slayer, Jurassic 5, Death Cab for Cutie, and more. Kretz has cited John Bonham, Bill Bruford and Neil Peart as the drummers who have influenced him the most.

Equipment

In the Core era, Kretz used a Yamaha Rock Tour Custom drumset before switching to GMS Drums in late 1992/early 1993.

References

External links
Kretz's Bomb Shelter Studios

1966 births
Living people
American rock drummers
Grunge musicians
Musicians from San Jose, California
Stone Temple Pilots members
American male drummers
20th-century American drummers
21st-century American drummers
Talk Show (band) members